Mesorhizobium shonense is a bacterium from the genus Mesorhizobium which was isolated in southern Ethiopia.

References

External links
Type strain of Mesorhizobium shonense at BacDive -  the Bacterial Diversity Metadatabase	

Phyllobacteriaceae
Bacteria described in 2013